A by-election was held for the New South Wales Legislative Assembly electorate of Tumut on 10 May 1860 because of the resignation of George Lang.

Dates

Result

George Lang resigned. The by-election was overturned by the Election and Qualifications Committee due to voting irregularities.

Aftermath
While Daniel Deniehy was declared elected he was also elected at the East Macquarie by-election held on the same day, Deniehy took his seat as the member for East Macquarie and doesn't appear in the records kept by the Legislative Assembly as a member for Tumut.

See also
Electoral results for the district of Tumut
List of New South Wales state by-elections

References

1860 elections in Australia
New South Wales state by-elections
1860s in New South Wales